George Keppel, 3rd Earl of Albemarle KG PC (London, 8 April 1724 – 13 October 1772), styled Viscount Bury until 1754, was a British general and nobleman. He is best known for his decisive victory over the Spanish during capture of Havana in 1762, as part of the Seven Years' War.

Early life
He came from a wealthy and powerful Dutch family from Guelders who had close connections to the Princes of Orange that had moved to England in the seventeenth century, in the aftermath of the Glorious Revolution. His father was Willem van Keppel, 2nd Earl of Albemarle. Through his mother, Lady Anne Lennox, he was a great-grandson of King Charles II of England. He started his military career serving in the Dutch Army fighting against the French, and in 1745, Keppel participated in the Battle of Fontenoy as an aide to Prince William, Duke of Cumberland.

Military career

George Keppel had been previously in his military life commissioned an ensign in the Coldstream Guards in 1738, becoming a captain-lieutenant of the 1st Regiment of Dragoons in 1741, aged 17, and a captain-lieutenant of the Coldstreams on 7 April 1743. Appointed aide-de-camp to the Duke of Cumberland in February 1745, was promoted to captain and lieutenant-colonel on 27 May 1745. The next year, he was promoted colonel and made aide-de-camp to the King on 24 April 1746. He had fought at the Battle of Culloden with his father and carried the dispatch of Cumberland's success to London.

Bury, later 3rd Earl of Albemarle, was returned as Member of Parliament for Chichester in 1746. He was appointed a Lord of the Bedchamber to the Duke of Cumberland in 1748, a post he held until the Duke's death in 1765. On 1 November 1749, he was given the colonelcy of the 20th Regiment of Foot. He succeeded to the earldom on the death of his father in 1754; his younger brother Augustus replaced him as MP for Chichester.

On 8 April 1755, he became colonel of the 3rd (The King's Own) Regiment of Dragoons. He was promoted major-general on 1 February 1756 and lieutenant-general on 1 April 1759. He was appointed Governor of Jersey on 26 January 1761 and sworn a Privy Counsellor on 28 January.

The outbreak of the Seven Years' War once again caused him to return to active duty, and in July 1762, he was chosen to lead an assault on Havana. The siege was extraordinarily successful, inflicting 11,670 casualties on the Spanish in return for British casualties being under half of that number. In addition to the capture of the second capital of the Spanish Empire, 10 ships of the line, 2 frigates, 2 sloops and 100 merchant ships were captured. The humiliating Spanish defeat helped end the war in the favour of the British.

Later life
Keppel was made a Knight of the Garter in 1765 and was appointed Keeper of Bagshot Park in 1766. On 20 April 1770 at Bagshot Park, he married Anne Miller (died 3 July 1824), daughter of Sir John Miller, 4th Baronet, by whom he had a son, William Charles (1772–1849).

Politically, he was a prominent member of the Rockingham Whigs in the House of Lords. He was made a general on 26 May 1772, and died in October of that year.

Legacy
Albemarle Street in Halifax, Nova Scotia is named after him.

See also

 Great Britain in the Seven Years War

References

External links
 The Capture of Havana, 1762 Greenwich maritime museum

1724 births
1772 deaths
1st The Royal Dragoons officers
3rd The King's Own Hussars officers
British Army generals
Bury, George Keppel, Viscount
Bury, George Keppel, Viscount
Coldstream Guards officers
Colonial heads of Cuba
George 3
Governors of Jersey
George Keppel, 3rd Earl of Albemarle
Knights of the Garter
Lancashire Fusiliers officers
Bury, George Keppel, Viscount
Members of the Privy Council of Great Britain
British Army personnel of the Jacobite rising of 1745
British Army personnel of the Seven Years' War
People from Quidenham
Military personnel from London